Thomas Monro (1759–1833) was a British art collector and patron. He was Principal Physician of the Bethlem Royal Hospital and one-time consulting physician to George III.

Physician
Thomas Monro was born 1759, in London, youngest son of Dr John Monro (9th of Fyrish) and Elizabeth Culling Smith. He was educated at Harrow under Samuel Parr and attended Oriel College, Oxford where he graduated as a Doctor of Medicine in 1787. Admitted as a Fellow of the Royal College of Physicians in 1791, and acted as Censor on three separate occasions. He delivered the Harveian Oration in 1799. In 1811, he was named as an Elect of the College.

Like his father and grandfather he was employed at Bedlam starting as Assistant Physician in 1787. 
He attended on George III in a joint consultation of specialists during the king's second illness in 1811–12, although Queen Charlotte ensured that his further involvement did not extend beyond that of a passive observer.

In 1792 he became Principal Physician as successor to his father.
He resigned in June 1816, as a result of scandal when he was accused of ‘wanting in humanity’ towards his patients.

Patron

Monro was also known as a patron to numerous artists (including Peter De Wint, Thomas Girtin, John Sell Cotman and William Turner). 
The group of artists around him was known as 'The Monro Circle' and included students from his ‘Academy’ in London, where evening classes were given.

Other painters who visited his home included J.M.W. Turner, Joseph Farington, Thomas Hearne (1744–1817), James Bourne, Henry Edridge, William Henry Hunt, John Laporte and John Varley.

Monro had a house in Adelphi Terrace, London and a cottage in Fetcham, Surrey (until 1805).  
From 1807 until his death, on 14 May 1833, he lived in a 'country house' in Merry Hill near Bushey in Hertfordshire.

Monro was himself an amateur artist, and a pupil of John Laporte.

Family
Monro had several children, and three of his sons also became artists, in particular Henry (1791–1814). 
Coincidentally, Monro's distant kinsman Hugh Andrew Johnstone Munro of Novar would later be one of Turner's chief patrons.

See also
The Monro family of Physicians

References

Attribution

External links

 Thomas Monro at Contemporary Art.

1759 births
1833 deaths
People educated at Harrow School
Alumni of Oriel College, Oxford
18th-century English painters
English male painters
19th-century English painters
Heads of psychiatric hospitals
19th-century English male artists
18th-century English male artists